"Eyes Without a Face" is a power ballad by English rock musician Billy Idol, from his second album Rebel Yell (1983). It was released in 1984 as the second single from the album. The song is softer and more ballad-like than most of the album's other singles. It reached No. 4 on the Billboard Hot 100, becoming Idol's first Top 10 hit in the USA. The recording features the voice of Perri Lister—she appeared in the banned video for "Hot in the City"—who sings "Les yeux sans visage" (French for "Eyes without a face") as a background chorus. The title of the song refers to the English title of French director Georges Franju's 1960 film Les yeux sans visage.

In a retrospective review of the single, AllMusic journalist Donald A. Guarisco praised the song and wrote: "The music plays against the dark tone of the lyrics with a ballad-styled melody  yearning verses that slowly build emotion and a quietly wrenching chorus that relieves the emotional tension in a cathartic manner."

Background
In his memoir, Dancing with Myself, Idol explained he had always been fascinated with the titles of horror films, including the 1960 French movie Les Yeux Sans Visage (Eyes Without a Face). The movie concerns a plastic surgeon who vowed to restore the face of his daughter who had been disfigured in a car accident, and this quest led him to murder victims and graft their facial features onto his daughter in an attempt to restore her beauty. By the end, all that remained of her original face was her eyes, thus making her "eyes without a face". Idol saw some parallel between the movie and the moral decay he experienced living in New York in the 1980s. He said,

In the studio, Idol told guitarist Steve Stevens about the tune he had, and Stevens fleshed it out with a revolving four-chord pattern (Emaj7-C#m-G#m-B). Stevens then came up with a hard rock guitar riff in the middle of the song. Idol said he improvised some rap verses over the riff because "rap was everywhere in New York at the time, in all the discos and clubs, so it made sense after my croon to start talking streetwise over Steve's supersonic barrage of sound."

Critical reception
Cash Box said that the song is "more subdued" and "more sensitive" than Idol's previous single "Rebel Yell" and features "a silky acoustic guitar backdrop and a probing melodic bass line."

Formats and track listings
UK 7" vinyl single
"Eyes Without a Face"
"The Dead Next Door"

UK 12" vinyl single
"Eyes Without a Face"
"The Dead Next Door"
"Dancing With Myself"
"Rebel Yell"

Music video
The video was released in June 1984 and subsequently nominated for MTV Video Music Awards for "Best Editing" and "Best Cinematography". It was shot over an exhausting three-day period on a set with fog machines, lighting, and fire sources. Immediately after the shoot, Idol flew to perform in Arizona, where he discovered that his contact lenses had fused to his eyeballs, attributing it to the harsh video shoot and dry plane air. He was taken to a hospital where the lenses were removed and his eyes bandaged for three days, until his scraped corneas grew back.

Charts

Weekly charts

Year-end charts

References

External links

1980s ballads
1983 songs
1984 singles
Billy Idol songs
Chrysalis Records singles
Franglais songs
Music videos directed by David Mallet (director)
New wave ballads
Song recordings produced by Keith Forsey
Songs written by Billy Idol
Songs written by Steve Stevens
Synth-pop ballads